Simone Santi (born May 24, 1966) is an Italian volleyball referee. He refereed matches in Europe, Turkey, Bulgary , Russia, Japan, South Korea, Brasil, Argentina. In 2012 he refereed at the London Olympic Games.

References
 Simone Santi, un fischietto a cinque cerchi – La storia del primo tifernate nella storia delle Olimpiadi
 FIVB Referees database

1966 births
Living people